Gösta "Gus" Peterson (1923–28 July 2017) was a Swedish fashion photographer whose work has appeared in several publications including The New York Times, Esquire, and Harper's Bazaar.

Early life
Peterson was born in Stockholm in 1923 and grew up in Örebro, before returning to Stockholm where he studied to become an illustrator. He went to work in an advertising agency in Stockholm. A relative invited him to come to the US and in 1948 he moved to New York, where he got a job as illustrator at the department store Lord & Taylor.  Although of service age, he did not serve in World War II.

Career
When he left Sweden he was given a Rolleiflex camera as a leaving present from  the Gumelius advertising agency where he was working. Self-taught, he honed his skills as a photographer practicing street photography on the streets of New York.  In 1954 he met his future wife Patricia, who at the time was fashion editor of The New York Times, at a cocktail party in Westhampton. He caught her eye as he was wearing khaki pants and watering flowers at the party. He married her the same year. Peterson credits her with helping him jumpstart his career as a photographer.

In the 1950s he took on several assignments from magazines, picking up the nickname Yes for his willingness to take on assignments. After his wife became vice president at Henri Bendel, the latter company changed its advertising from illustrations to half-page advertorials using his photographs. Working for Henri Bendel he produced a new set of photographs weekly: doing the session on Thursday, with the photographs ready the following day and published in the Sunday edition of The New York Times a couple of days later. This helped cement his reputation as a fashion photographer.

From the 1950s to 1980s his work was featured in and on the cover of several magazines, including GQ, Mademoiselle, Town & Country, and  L'Officiel, amongst others. Despite his reputation as a fashion photographer, he never worked for Vogue; he turned them down as they insisted on choosing the models.

He was the first photographer to photograph British model Twiggy in America when she arrived in 1967. Later that year African-American model Naomi Sims approached him to photograph her. She had been turned down by several photographic agencies which told her that her skin was too dark. Peterson became the first photographer to photograph her, and his photograph of her appeared on the Autumn 1967 cover of The New York Times fashion supplement, the first time an African-American female appeared on the cover of that magazine.

Early in Peterson's career, fashion photographer Arthur Elgort worked as his assistant for four months. Peterson's use of natural light in turn influenced Elgort's work.   Model and later fashion designer Linda Rodin also worked as his assistant for three years in the late 1970s.

His work has been described as groundbreaking and pioneering, and has been rated as being in the same category as Irving Penn, Richard Avedon, and Helmut Newton. He would often photograph lavishly-dressed models in "mundane, vulgar settings". His work is noted for its staging and composition; he often used humorous or dramatic scenarios to convey the image and pioneered "a more informal, personal approach to fashion photography". Apart from his fashion work he also photographed Salvador Dalí and Duke Ellington.

Peterson retired in 1986. In January 2015 a retrospective of his work, From The Archive, was shown at the Turn Gallery in New York.  His work has also been shown at the Metropolitan Museum of Art in New York and the Victoria and Albert Museum in London.

He died on 28 July 2017 at the age of 94.

References

External links 
Turn Gallery exhibition site 

1923 births
2017 deaths
Swedish photographers
Fashion photographers
Swedish emigrants to the United States
People from Örebro